The Palisades Nuclear Generating Station was a nuclear power plant located on Lake Michigan, in Van Buren County's Covert Township, Michigan, on a  site  south of South Haven, Michigan, USA. Palisades was owned and operated by Entergy. It had been operated by the Nuclear Management Company and owned by CMS Energy Corporation prior to the sale completed on April 11, 2007.

The Westinghouse Electric Company turbine generator can produce 725,000 kilowatts of electricity.

Built between 1967 and 1970, Palisades was approved to operate at full power in 1973.

On July 12, 2006, it was announced that the plant would be sold to Entergy. On April 11, 2007, the plant was sold to Entergy for $380 million. The plant's original licensee was due to expire on March 24, 2011. An application for 20-year extension was filed in 2005 with the Nuclear Regulatory Commission. It was granted on January 18, 2007. Therefore, the plant was then scheduled for decommissioning by 2031.

Entergy had made a decision to close the plant in October 2018. A decision by the Michigan Public Service Commission (MPSC) influenced the company's decision. Consumers Energy attempted to buy its way out of a power purchase agreement it has with Entergy and the plant. The MPSC did not approve Consumer Energy's full request of $172 million, so Entergy decided to keep the plant open three years longer than planned. On April 20, 2022, just weeks before the facility was scheduled to close, Michigan governor Gretchen Whitmer requested federal funding to keep the facility open.

Entergy closed the Palisades plant in May 2022 and its sale to Holtec International was completed in June 2022. However, in September 2022, Holtec applied for funds from the Civil Nuclear Credit to reopen the plant. This request was denied in November 2022  In December 2022, Holtec announced that it will reapply for funds from the Civil Nuclear Credit in order to restart Palisades.

Electricity Production

Spent fuel storage
Spent fuel is stored outdoors in 21  storage casks, each containing 30 tons and resting on a concrete pad. This was intended to be a temporary solution until the spent fuel repository at Yucca Mountain nuclear waste repository opened.

Parts replacement
Two steam generators were replaced in 1992. This involved cutting a 28 by 26 foot opening through the  reinforced concrete wall. The removed units are stored in a large concrete building on plant property.

Surrounding population

The 2010 U.S. population within  of Palisades was 28,644, a decrease of 4.5 percent in a decade, according to an analysis of U.S. Census data for msnbc.com. The 2010 U.S. population within  was 1,326,618, an increase of 4.4 percent since 2000. Cities within 50 miles include South Bend, IN (45 miles to city center) and Kalamazoo, MI.

Seismic risk
The Nuclear Regulatory Commission's estimate of the risk each year of an earthquake intense enough to cause core damage to the reactor at Palisades was 1 in 156,250, according to an NRC study published in August 2010.

Visiting

Like all U.S. nuclear power plants since September 11, 2001, public access to Palisades is prohibited. However, Palisades can be glimpsed from the neighboring Van Buren State Park.

Decommissioning 
Originally planned to operate through May 31, 2022, concerns over a faulty control rod drive seal prompted operators to remove the plant from service on May 20.

Once all fuel is removed from the reactor core, Holtec will buy the plant from Entergy and begin a three year process of moving all fuel to dry cask storage.  Then a ten year pause to allow the decommissioning trust fund balance to grow followed by a 6 year long dismantling process, with an estimated completion date of 2041.

The cost of decommissioning will be covered by a $550-million trust fund, paid for by Consumers Energy customers.

See also 

 List of nuclear reactors
 Nuclear energy policy of the United States
 Nuclear reactor accidents in the United States

Notes

References

External links

Energy infrastructure completed in 1971
Buildings and structures in Van Buren County, Michigan
CMS Energy
Nuclear power plants in Michigan
Nuclear power stations using pressurized water reactors
Entergy
1971 establishments in Michigan